Caught in a Flue is a 1914 short one-reel comedy film starring Fatty Arbuckle. It was directed by Morgan Wallace and produced by Mack Sennett. The film's alternative title was The Burglar Scare.

Synopsis
After Bertie is kicked out of the house he tries to regain entry at the same time as a burglar, and the two get caught in the chimney together.

Cast
 Roscoe 'Fatty' Arbuckle as Bertie.

See also
 List of American films of 1914
 Fatty Arbuckle filmography

References

External links

1914 films
1914 comedy films
1914 short films
American silent short films
American black-and-white films
Keystone Studios films
Silent American comedy films
American comedy short films
1910s American films
1910s English-language films